"Evidently Chickentown" is a poem by the English performance poet John Cooper Clarke. The poem uses repeated profanity to convey a sense of futility and exasperation. Featured on Clarke's 1980 album Snap, Crackle & Bop, the realism of its lyrics is married with haunting, edgy arrangements.

The poem bears a resemblance to a 1952 work titled "The Bloody Orkneys",  
written by Andrew James Fraser Blair, author and journalist, under the pseudonym Captain Hamish Blair.
In 2009 Clarke said he "didn't consciously copy it. But I must have heard that poem, years ago. It's terrific." Clarke appears as himself reciting "Evidently Chickentown" in the 2007 British film Control, directed by Anton Corbijn.

"Evidently Chickentown" appears in Danny Boyle's 2001 film Strumpet, in Jacques Audiard's 2012 film Rust and Bone, during the transition between the subject matter of parts 1 and 2 in the 2021 two-part documentary Tiger, and at the beginning of S1 E5 of Danny Boyle's 2022 biopic Pistol entitled "Track 5: Nancy and Sid." It was also used at the end of "Stage 5", a 2007 episode of the American television drama The Sopranos. Sean O'Neal of The A.V. Club wrote that the poem "ranks as one of the show's sharpest and most effective musical moments, somehow capturing the vexation of a New York mafia guy with the words of a British punk who's complaining about flat beer and cold chips."

References

External links
 
 
 Evidently Chickentown – complete lyrics at johncooperclarke.com

English poems
1980 poems
The Sopranos